Katrina Grey is a Slovakian actress who is best known for the Hollywood movie Hard Target 2 as Kay Sutherland, and the French movie Brice 3.  French movie Brice 3

Early life
Katrina Grey was born as Katarina Greguskova in Ilava, Slovakia. Following her film debut, she created her stage name, Katrina Grey. At a young age she began studying at ZUS drama school where she was involved in various types of dance, taking singing lessons, playing the Accordion and performing in theatre. She studied grammar school at Gymnazium Ludovita Stura in Trenčín, Slovakia where she received a scholarship through the Rotary club International to study in Mexico at Colegio de Chihuahua, where she continued performing in theatre. It is here she received the prize for Best Performance in the musical “Cats” in Spanish.

After her exchange program in Mexico, she continued her studies at Mendel University Brno, Czech Republic, where she received a bachelor and masters's degree in International Development Studies. Katrina Grey is fluent in English, Spanish and French, advanced in Russian, in addition to her native tongue Slovak and Czech. Katrina Grey loves adrenaline sports, writing, music and is also a certified scuba diver.

Career
Grey was first featured as a model in Honolulu Street Pulse's magazine in 2013 after being approached by photographer Tony Grillo in Honolulu, Hawaii ( Artistic Mindz Photography). Following this opportunity, she continued shooting TV commercials and movies whilst learning on-screen action fighting and combat. Her first taste of Hollywood was working with Blake Lively (Savages, Age of Adaline) in the psychological drama All I See Is You, starring Jason Clarke (Terminator Genisys, Everest) and directed by Marc Forster (Quantum of Solace, World War Z).

Grey made her on-screen debut in the short movie "Return of the Golden Lily", directed by Takashi Hirose and Magnus Thors, which was shot in Thailand. The film received the Experienced Vision Award for "Best Film" at the Thailand International Film Destination Festival 2014. Not long after this, she landed a role in Takashi Hirose's upcoming horror movie "BRUTAL" shot in Japan starring alongside Naho Nakashima (Final Fantasy XIII).

Grey made her American feature film debut in the movie Ghost House directed by Rich Ragsdale (According to Jim, Less than Perfect), alongside Scout Taylor-Compton (Halloween, Halloween II, The Runaways) and James Landry Hébert (Super 8, Looper). The movie was produced by KNR Productions and Benetone Films.

Having proven herself as a talented actress, Grey was cast in Hard Target 2 (2016), the sequel to Jean-Claude Van Damme's (Universal Soldier, Kickboxer), Hard Target (1993), alongside Scott Adkins (The Expendables 2, The Bourne Ultimatum), Robert Knepper and Rhona Mitra. Hard Target 2 is directed by Roel Reiné (Death Race 2, The Scorpion King 3: Battle for Redemption) released by Universal Studios.

In 2015, Grey appeared in an episode for a Travel Show for Slovak TV channel RTVS called Cestou Necestou shot in Bangkok, Thailand. No long after, Grey got a role in the French comedy Brice 3 acting alongside Oscar winning actor Jean Dujardin (The Artist, The Wolf of Wall Street) and Clovis Cornillac (Asterix at the Olympic Games).Brice 3 is French comedy written and directed by James Huth (Brice de Nice, Hellphone) and is the sequel to the successful original film Brice de Nice.

In 2017, Grey starred in the movie Locked Up directed by Jared Cohn (12/12/12, Jailbait). Grey also appeared in the movie Troy 2 where she played Helen of Troy directed by Tekin Girkin (The Incision, Peaceful Oblivion) starring Dylan Vox (Hercules Reborn, Dead 7) produced by Benetone Films . She also played the role of a German mother in the Indie short film called Milk produced by Korean female director Yu Jin Jang.

In 2018, Grey played the role of “Green” in the episode Kobe, which is part of the sci-fi series called Future sex produced by H1 films for Blackpills and directed by MacGregor and Bruno Zacarias.

Katrina Grey is also a Screenwriter. In 2020 Grey has written a psychological drama/thriller called Daytime Nightmare and wrote a horror/thriller movie called Hostel Paradise and starred in Malaysian zombie horror called Infeksi Zombie- Belaban Hidup. She is also a member of Equity and Spotlight.

Filmography

Film

Television

Screenwriter

See also
 All I See Is You (film)
 Blake Lively

References

External links
 
 
 

Living people
Slovak actresses
Mendel University Brno alumni
1991 births
People from Ilava